Offerman is a surname. Notable people with the surname include:

 José Offerman (born 1968), Dominican baseball player
 JoJo Offerman (born 1994), American ring announcer
 Nick Offerman (born 1970), American actor, writer, comedian, and producer